Chang Chia-juch (born 25 June 1950 in Shanghai)  was Taiwanese politician who was the Minister of Economic Affairs of Taiwan from 2013 to 2014.

Early life
A native of Shanghai, Chang obtained his bachelor's degree in civil engineering from National Cheng Kung University. He continued his master's degree in the same field from San Jose State University in the United States and his doctoral degree in transportation engineering from Purdue University.

ROC Economic Affairs Ministry

Longmen nuclear power plant
In mid April 2013, commenting on Taiwan's fourth nuclear power plant construction, Chang said that the power plant has undergone rigorous integration and testing, therefore it is inappropriate to call the plant as an "assembled car". He added that the MOEA has created a team to inspect the overall system of the plant over the next six months to end the controversy.

Electric vehicle industry
Speaking at an automotive trade show in mid April 2013, Chang spoke about Taiwan's young electric vehicle industry. In the midst of growing world oil price and rising environmental awareness, he said that the MOEA is currently considering efforts to lower the cost of manufacturing, marketing and distributing electric vehicles to general public.

However, he acknowledged the current stumbling blocks for common usage of electric vehicle, especially on the current technology and availability of the charging stations around Taiwan.

2013 H7N9 flu virus outbreak
In end of April 2013 during the H7N9 flu virus outbreak, citing from the research result from Taiwan Institute of Economic Research, Chang warned that if this outbreak continues for three months, Taiwan's GDP forecast will drop by 0.004%. The flu will also hit Taiwan's consumption, production and export-related sectors if the outbreak gets worse. To mitigate this situation, Chang said that the MOEA has prepared a special task force to monitor the ongoing situation, and they will aim to be well-prepared to prevent the disease from spreading further.

Taiwan's Q1 2013 economic growth
Commenting on Taiwan's Q1 2013 lower-than-expected 1.54% economic growth at Legislative Yuan in end of April 2013, Chang said the MOEA will continue to promote policies to strengthen Taiwan's export and domestic investment. He also reassure people to be more optimistic on the annual GDP growth, because low GDP growth in Q1 doesn't mean low GDP growth in the remaining quarters in the same year.

2014 APEC Ministerial meeting
In mid May 2014 during the Asia-Pacific Economic Cooperation (APEC) Ministerial meeting in Qingdao, Shandong, Chang had a meeting with PRC Minister of Commerce Gao Hucheng. Chang asked the Mainland China side to give a pragmatic response to the key problems that are the challenges to the singing of the Cross-Strait Service Trade Agreement between the two sides, in which those problems are linked primarily to the industrial sectors. Gao promised that the Mainland side will continue their internal coordination and reiterated Beijing's effort to promote a win-win condition for cross-strait exchanges.

References

1950 births
Living people
Businesspeople from Shanghai
Republic of China politicians from Shanghai
Taiwanese Ministers of Economic Affairs
Purdue University College of Engineering alumni
San Jose State University alumni
National Cheng Kung University alumni
Taiwanese chairpersons of corporations
Businesspeople in steel
21st-century Taiwanese businesspeople
20th-century Taiwanese businesspeople
Taiwanese people from Shanghai